Ned Lagin (born March 17, 1948) is an American artist, photographer, scientist, composer, and keyboardist.

Lagin is considered a pioneer in the development and use of minicomputers and personal computers in real-time stage and studio music composition and performance.

He is known for his electronic music composition Seastones, for performing  with the Grateful Dead, and for his photography and art.

Early years
Ned Lagin was born in New York City and raised on Long Island in Roslyn Heights, New York. Growing up, Lagin was influenced by classical and jazz music, and the modern music and art cultures of New York City in the 1960s. He started photography with a Kodak Baby Brownie Special at the age of five, and piano lessons and science, natural history, and electronic projects at the age of six.

He attended the Wheatley School in Old Westbury, New York, was awarded two National Science Foundation Scholarships, and attended the Massachusetts Institute of Technology with the intention of becoming an astronaut. Lagin received a degree in molecular biology and humanities from MIT in 1971, where he studied with John Harbison, Gregory Tucker, David Epstein, Noam Chomsky, Gian-Carlo Rota, Salvador Luria, and Jerome Lettvin. Chomsky's generative grammar concepts inspired Lagin's thinking about creating generative music forms (1968), and Lettvin connected him to the writings of Norbert Wiener and Warren McCulloch, and more generally to cybernetics.

While at MIT, Lagin also completed jazz coursework at the Berklee School of Music. He was deeply influenced by the jazz world in New York City, particularly pianist Bill Evans, whom he met in Boston and saw perform many times in New York and Boston in the late 1960s and early 1970s. During this period, Evans wrote out some of his tunes for Lagin. His piano teachers included Dean Earl, a Charlie Parker sideman, and he studied jazz improvisation with Lee Konitz. He played piano in the MIT Concert Jazz Band and MIT Jazz Quintet led by Herb Pomeroy, a sideman with Duke Ellington and Stan Getz.

In the autumn of 1971, Lagin began graduate study in composition as an Irving Fine Fellow at Brandeis University, where he studied with Josh Rifkin and Seymour Shifrin.  He completed a symphony, a string quartet, jazz big band pieces, and electronic pieces before dropping out and permanently relocating to the Bay Area.

Performing with the Grateful Dead
In early 1970, Lagin initiated a correspondence with Jerry Garcia after seeing the Grateful Dead at the Boston Tea Party in 1969. In May 1970, he helped facilitate a concert and free live outdoor performance featuring the band at MIT that coincided with the Kent State shootings. That summer, Lagin, at Garcia's invitation, visited San Francisco and contributed piano to "Candyman" during the American Beauty album sessions, played in several jams, and started what would become close friendships with Garcia, bassist Phil Lesh, and David Crosby.

From 1970 to 1975, Lagin sat in on Hammond B3 organ, electric piano, and clavichord during long instrumental passages at several Grateful Dead concerts. His first performances with the Grateful Dead were on November 5 and November 8, 1970 at the Capitol Theater in Port Chester, New York; his first complete concert was at Boston University's Sargent Gym on November 21, 1970.

During many 1974 Grateful Dead concerts over several tours, including Europe, he performed a middle set of electronic music, including parts of his composition Seastones, on computer-controlled analog synthesizers with Phil Lesh on electronically processed bass. Some sets included Jerry Garcia playing guitar filtered through effects processors and Bill Kreutzmann on drums; these sets occasionally segued into the final Grateful Dead set, with Lagin performing with the Dead, including an appearance in The Grateful Dead Movie.

During the 1974 tours, he played through the vocal system of the Wall of Sound PA, in quad, with 9600 watts going through over two hundred speakers.

The March 17, 1975 cancelled Grateful Dead studio session became a Seastones session with Crosby and included "Ned's Birthday Jam."

"Seastones" is included in these live Grateful Dead albums:
 Dick's Picks Volume 12
 Dave's Picks Volume 17
 Dave's Picks Volume 34

Seastones

In 1975 Lagin released Seastones, a quadraphonic album of electronic music (composed between 1970–1974 and constituting a small part of the complete Seastones composition) on Round Records and then United Artists Records.

A new, two CD album of Seastones was released on March 8, 2018. This album, not a re-issue, presents most but not all of the composition as originally composed but never released or heard before. For this release, Seastones was re-mixed and re-mastered in stereo. It includes most of the original 1970–1974 studio forms, those parts of Lagin's concurrent but unfinished composition L that are shared with Seastones, as well as some of the moment forms generated and incorporated into the composition from live performances that took place from 1973 to 1975. This two CD album contains 83 tracks (54 tracks on CD One and 29 tracks on CD Two) and altogether is 111 minutes long.

Science career
During his professional career in science and engineering R&D (1976–2011) he worked on the earliest home computing technology with an Altair 8800; was a pre-release Apple Macintosh software seed developer; developed real time digital video and image processing systems; biotechnology and immunology instrumentation; DNA, RNA, and peptide synthesis and sequencing hardware and artificial intelligence software; early wireless network routing systems; and consulted in ecological planning, design and habitat restoration, including aerial and ecological photography for environmental studies.

Photography and art

Lagin began photography at the age of five, first with a Baby Brownie camera, and subsequently with other small format cameras. From childhood and continuing through to the beginning of college, photography was for him part of being an amateur naturalist and scientist. Beginning in 1978, and continuing for the next 40 years, Lagin's primary media for creativity has been photography and art. First in small, medium (6x6cm, 6x7cm), and large (4x5) format film photography (using 1928 and 1950's Speed Graphic cameras), and subsequently using film scanners and Photoshop (1992), and digital cameras (2003).  His photography and art influences include Ansel Adams, Elliot Porter, Walker Evans, Edward Weston, Life magazine and The World We Live In, and National Geographic.

Lagin's images, as single photographs and paintings, and in compositions of multiple images, include nature, landscapes, sand drawings, nudes, erotica, and self-portraits. His creation of sand drawings and multi-image forms to create "fields of meaning(s)" was influenced by the rock art and imagery (petroglyphs, pictographs) of Native Americans, Australian Aboriginals, and prehistoric Europeans. Lagin's photographic, sand drawing, and painting collections and artist's books, spanning 1981–2017, include: Our Love, Metaphysics, Light in the Silence, Artifacts of Desire, Reflections of Solitude, and Light Time Geographies. Additionally, Lagin has written a collection of writings titled Notes about art, metaphysics, natural history, photography, pictures and "the natural history of picture world". From his Notes: 

"when you look at a picture
the picture looks at you"

Cat Dreams
Completed in 2016, Cat Dreams is Ned Lagin's first music CD, and first public music, since 1975. Cat Dreams is formally a suite of composed pieces, and composed melodic, tonal, and rhythmic frameworks for improvisation. These are presented as solo, duo, small group, and band; acoustic, electric, electronic music. Originally composed and planned for a two CD release, Cat Dreams is the first of the two CDs that comprise the full suite of compositions.

On Cat Dreams, Lagin plays electric piano, keyboard synths (including vocals, cello, acoustic guitar, electric guitar, pedal steel guitar, banjo, and others), Native American flutes, and softsynths: Ableton Live and Max for Live, Reason, Reaktor

The other musicians performing on Cat Dreams:

Barry Finnerty – electric guitar
Dewayne Pate – electric bass
Barry Sless – pedal steel guitar
Alex Maldonado – Native American flute
Celso Alberti – drums, percussion
Kevin Hayes – drums
Gary Vogensen – electric guitar
Dick Bright – violin

Community and environment
Lagin has served in Novato, California and Marin County government: Planning Commission, Downtown Plan Committee Chairperson, Economic Development Commission, Tree Task Force, Marin Conservation League Board of Directors, Marin County Flood Control Advisory Board, and chairperson for the Warner Creek Committee.

Footnotes

External links
 
 Annotated Nedbase

American rock keyboardists
Avant-garde keyboardists
Living people
1948 births
People from Old Westbury, New York
Musicians from New York City
Massachusetts Institute of Technology alumni
Berklee College of Music alumni
People from Roslyn Heights, New York
The Wheatley School alumni